Krizza is a 2012 album by Krizza Neri. Aiza Seguerra produced the album under her own label Blackbird Music.

Track listing

References

2012 albums
Universal Records (Philippines) albums